Guliston ( — flower country) also spelled as Gulistan, formerly known as Mirzachül (until 1961) and Qayroqqum (from 1962 - 2015), is the capital of Sirdaryo Region in eastern Uzbekistan. It is a district-level city.

Geography and climate

Geography 
Its population is 91,300 (2021). The main industry in the area is cottonpicking.

Climate

Demographics

References

 Guliston. (2007). In Encyclopædia Britannica. Retrieved September 28, 2007, from Encyclopædia Britannica Online: http://www.britannica.com/eb/article-9038486

Populated places in Sirdaryo Region
Cities in Uzbekistan